Irfan Brković is a Bosnian interdisciplinary artist based in New York. He is a Member of The Wooster Group.

Career 
In the early 2000s Irfan founded audio visual collective Fa11out. After receiving his degree from Academy of Drama in Bosnia he traveled Europe filming and performing live shows. His practice spans a broad range of disciplines including video art, generative art, interactive design with focus on live performance. In his shows he uses modified printers, copy fax machines, video mixers, game consoles and interactive audiovisual softwares. He performed in Europe and United States and released music for drum and bass labels from United Kingdom.

He moved to New York and filmed documentary The Healing Power of Jazz for The New Yorker with premieres at Cineteca National Mexico, Warsaw Film Festival, Vilnius International Film Festival and Kasseler Dokfest.   His work Three Deaths (2020) was premiered at Sundance Film Festival. 

Since 2019 Irfan become member and video artist for The Wooster Group a New York City-based experimental theater company known for creating numerous original dramatic works.

Irfan has been a visiting lecturer at Sarajevo Film Festival and engaging artist and activist in Bosnia and Herzegovina.

References

External links 
 Official website
 
 

Living people
Yugoslav artists
Bosnia and Herzegovina video artists
Artists from New York City
1986 births